was a Japanese music variety show, broadcast weekly from October 15, 1996 until March 23, 2010 on TBS.

The show's theme song, played during the opening sequence and closing credits, was "These Boots Are Made for Walkin'" by Nancy Sinatra.

History

The show was first broadcast on October 16, 1996. Originally supposed to be called "J-Pop Hour", it was hosted by Takaaki Ishibashi, of comedy duo Tunnels, and Masahiro Nakai, leader of boy band SMAP. Hello! Project idol group Morning Musume were frequent guests on the show, at one point appearing almost weekly.

Nakai was briefly replaced by TBS announcer Shin'ichirō Azumi in late June 2006, due to conjunctivitis.

After 13 and a half years on air, the show made its final broadcast on March 23, 2010. It was reformatted into a new show called , also hosted by Ishibashi and Nakai, which aired on TBS from April 20 to September 14, 2010.

Performers

Moderators (MC)
Takaaki Ishibashi
Masahiro Nakai

Others

References

External links
 Official Site (Japanese)

Japanese variety television shows
Japanese music television series
TBS Television (Japan) original programming
1996 Japanese television series debuts
2010 Japanese television series endings